William Frederick Durst (born August 20, 1970) is an American rapper, singer, songwriter, actor, and director. He is the frontman and lyricist of the nu metal band Limp Bizkit, formed in 1994, with whom he has released seven studio albums.

Since 2006, Durst has worked on a number of independent films. He co-starred in Population 436, and made his directorial debut in 2007 with The Education of Charlie Banks. He followed with The Longshots in 2008. His latest film, The Fanatic, came out in 2019. He appears as a secret playable character in the video games Fight Club, WWF Raw, and WWF SmackDown! Just Bring It.

Early life
He was born Frederick Allen Mayne III in Jacksonville, Florida, but soon moved to Orlando and then a farm in Cherryville, North Carolina, at one year old. His mother had him rechristened as William Frederick Durst after remarrying. In the fifth grade, he moved to Gastonia, North Carolina, where he graduated from Hunter Huss High School. As a child, Durst was bullied, which he incorporated into his music. At the age of 12, Durst took an interest in breakdancing, hip hop, punk rock, and heavy metal. He began to rap, skate, beatbox, and DJ. Leaving the Navy after two years (1988-1990), Durst moved back to Jacksonville with his father where he worked as a landscaper and a tattoo artist while developing an idea for a band that combined elements of rock and hip-hop.

Career

Formation of Limp Bizkit (1994–1998)

In 1994, Durst, Malachi Sage bassist Sam Rivers, and Rivers' cousin John Otto jammed together and wrote three songs. Guitarist Wes Borland later joined. Durst named the band Limp Bizkit because he wanted a name that would repel listeners. Limp Bizkit developed a cult following in the underground music scene when its covers of George Michael's "Faith" and Paula Abdul's "Straight Up" began to attract curious concertgoers.

Later, when Korn performed in town as the opening act for Sick of It All, Durst invited Korn to his house. He was able to persuade bassist Reginald Arvizu to listen to demos of the songs "Pollution", "Counterfeit", and "Stalemate". Korn added a then-unsigned Limp Bizkit to two tours, which gave the band a new audience. DJ Lethal, formerly of the hip hop group House of Pain, joined the band as a turntablist; Durst's disagreements with Borland led the guitarist to quit and rejoin the band.

In 1997, Limp Bizkit signed with Flip Records, a subsidiary of Interscope Records, and released their debut album, Three Dollar Bill, Y'all to moderate response. On October 23, 1997, Durst met the band Staind, but friction quickly emerged between the two over the cover art of Staind's album. Durst unsuccessfully attempted to remove Staind from a concert bill shortly before their performance, but after hearing the band play, he was so impressed that he signed them to Flip/Elektra, recorded a demo with the band, and co-produced their next album, Dysfunction.

After Limp Bizkit finished a tour with the band Deftones, Durst and DJ Lethal were asked by Max Cavalera, formerly of the band Sepultura, to appear on "Bleed", a song from the self-titled debut of his new band Soulfly. Cavalera stated that producer Ross Robinson recommended that he work with Durst. Durst also made an appearance on Korn's album Follow the Leader. Jonathan Davis had intended to write a battle rap with B-Real of Cypress Hill, but the latter's label wouldn't let him do it, and Durst was tapped instead. Davis and Durst wrote the lyrics for "All in the Family", which featured the two vocalists trading insults. Davis and Durst would often offer suggestions for each other's lyrics; a lyric written by Durst as "tootin' on your bagpipe" was changed to "fagpipes" by Davis, who stated "I helped him bag on me better".

Durst began to take an interest in filmmaking, directing the music video for Limp Bizkit's single "Faith" in promotion for its appearance in the film Very Bad Things; he was unsatisfied with it and made a second video which paid tribute to tour mates Primus, Deftones and Mötley Crüe, who appeared in the video.

Mainstream success and controversies (1998–2005)

Limp Bizkit achieved mainstream success with the albums Significant Other (1999) and Chocolate Starfish and the Hot Dog Flavored Water (2000). In June 1999, Durst was appointed Senior Vice President of A&R at Interscope.

In the summer of 1999, Limp Bizkit played at the highly anticipated Woodstock '99 festival in front of approximately 200,000 people. The concert was tarnished by violent behavior from the crowd, much of which occurred during and after their performance, including fans tearing plywood from the walls during the song "Break Stuff". Several sexual assaults were reported in the aftermath of the concert. Durst stated during the concert, "People are getting hurt. Don't let anybody get hurt. But I don't think you should mellow out. That's what Alanis Morissette had you motherfuckers do. If someone falls, pick 'em up. We already let the negative energy out. Now we wanna let out the positive energy". Durst later stated in an interview, "I didn't see anybody getting hurt. You don't see that. When you're looking out on a sea of people and the stage is twenty feet in the air and you're performing, and you're feeling your music, how do they expect us to see something bad going on?" Les Claypool told the San Francisco Examiner, "Woodstock was just Durst being Durst. His attitude is 'no press is bad press', so he brings it on himself. He wallows in it. Still, he's a great guy." "It's easy to point the finger and blame [us], but they hired us for what we do — and all we did is what we do. I would turn the finger and point it back to the people that hired us," said Durst, in reference to original Woodstock co-founder, Michael Lang.

In June 2000, Limp Bizkit's tour was sponsored by the controversial file sharing service Napster. Durst was an outspoken advocate of file sharing. During the 2000 MTV Video Music Awards, Durst performed Limp Bizkit's song "Livin' It Up", as a duet with Christina Aguilera. In response to the performance, Filter frontman Richard Patrick claimed that "Fred getting onstage with Christina Aguilera embarrassed us all." In response to the negative reactions to the performance, Durst remarked, "People always just wanna talk about Britney or Christina. What's the problem? Because they make a type of music we aren't allowed to like? Or you think they are the nemesis of what our music is about? Why segregate? Why be so musically fuckin' racist? What do you mean, I can't hang out with these types of people? Clearly I didn't give a fuck, which fed a lot of it, too. I mean, someone that's not going to give in and apologise... it's gonna make people carry on talking."

During a 2001 tour of Australia at the Big Day Out festival in Sydney, fans rushed the stage in the mosh pit, and teenager Jessica Michalik died of asphyxiation. In Auckland, New Zealand, on the same tour, Durst threw water over the head of a security personnel tasked with defusing a similar situation. During the Big Day Out crush, Durst has been accused of taunting security guards intervening in the situation. In court, Durst, represented by his long-time attorney, Ed McPherson, testified he had warned the concert's organizers Aaron Jackson, Will Pearce and Amar Tailor and promoter Vivian Lees of the potential dangers of such minimal security. After viewing video and hearing witness testimony, the coroner said it was evident that the density of the crowd was dangerous at the time Limp Bizkit took the stage and Durst should have acted more responsibly when the problem became apparent. Durst stated that he was "emotionally scarred" because of the teenager's death.

In 2002, Durst was tapped to write songs for Britney Spears, and later said that he was in a relationship with her. Spears denied Durst's claims. In a 2009 interview, he explained that "I just guess at the time it was taboo for a guy like me to be associated with a gal like her." In February 2005, a sex tape featuring Durst was released on the Internet. Durst filed a $70 million lawsuit against ten websites that posted the video.

In May 2003, it was reported that Durst was working on a New Wave side-project alongside Limp Bizkit's Results May Vary album. The band, named Pacifica, was reportedly in its "very early stages" and had a sound reminiscent of Duran Duran and Soft Cell. News about the band stopped quickly and no releases ever surfaced.

In July 2003, Limp Bizkit participated on the Summer Sanitarium Tour, headlined by Metallica. In the days preceding the tour's stop in Chicago, local radio personality Mancow Muller mocked Durst and suggested that listeners who were attending the concert should heckle the singer and throw debris. With the crowd chanting "fuck Fred Durst" and pelting the stage with garbage, Durst erupted after six songs, threw the microphone down and walked off stage. Durst was eventually sued for breach of contract (for not completing the show) by Chicago lawyer Michael Young in a class-action suit.

In May 2005, The Unquestionable Truth (Part 1) was released. Sammy Siegler took over drumming duties for the band for much of the album. At Durst's insistence, the album was released as an underground album, without any advertising or promotion. The album sold over 2,000,000 copies worldwide, peaking at number 24 on the Billboard 200. Durst later announced that despite the album's title, no sequel to The Unquestionable Truth would be produced. Later in the year, the band released a Greatest Hitz album.

Having been bullied while growing up, Durst disliked seeing people "using my music as fuel to torture other people"; feeling that his music was being misinterpreted, he would later cite this as the reason for the band taking a hiatus.

Durst also said that he created a character for his music, but that he was also misunderstood by the public: "I always knew the guy in the red cap was not me. I'm Dr Frankenstein and that's my creature. Being a breakdancer, a graffiti artist, a tattoo artist and liking rock and hip hop was too much; it was a conscious effort to create Fred Durst and eventually I had to bring that guy out more than I wanted to. It took on a life of its own. I had to check into that character – the gorilla, the thing, the red cap guy. It's a painful transformation, but I do it 'cos that's what I was taught to do when you have people pulling at you".

Start of film career (2006–2009)

While Limp Bizkit was on hiatus, Durst began working in independent films. In 2006, Durst costarred in the film Population 436. His directorial debut, The Education of Charlie Banks, was released the following year. The film, which starred Jesse Eisenberg, Chris Marquette and Jason Ritter, received mixed reviews; Rotten Tomatoes gave the film a score of 48% based on reviews from 31 critics.  The website's consensus stated, "Unevenness and earnestness mire this otherwise sweet, surprising coming of age drama." A second directorial effort, The Longshots, starring Ice Cube and Keke Palmer, was released in 2008. Rotten Tomatoes gave the film a score of 41% based on 71 reviews, with the site's consensus indicating that the film was "a largely formulaic affair, rarely deviating from the inspirational sports movie playbook." The same year, Durst appeared as a bartender in two episodes of the television medical drama House, M.D.

Limp Bizkit reunion (2009–present)
In 2009, the original lineup of Limp Bizkit reunited and began touring. Durst announced that they had begun to record a new album, Gold Cobra. The album was released on June 28, 2011, receiving mixed reviews. It peaked at number 16 on the Billboard 200.

In 2012, Durst appeared on the Insane Clown Posse cover album Smothered, Covered & Chunked on a cover of AMG's "Bitch Betta Have My Money". In February 2012, Lil Wayne announced in a radio interview that Limp Bizkit had signed to his label, Cash Money Records, which Durst confirmed on his Twitter page. A few months later Durst was featured alongside Lil Wayne and Birdman on the Kevin Rudolf song "Champions", which peaked in the top 10 on iTunes.

Originally, Durst was to direct and produce the film Pawn Shop Chronicles, starring Paul Walker; but Wayne Kramer was later chosen to direct the film. In 2014, Durst shot three commercials for the website Eharmony, In February 2018, Durst began filming The Fanatic, starring John Travolta.

Personal life 
Durst has a daughter named Adriana Durst. She was born on June 3, 1990, to Durst and his then-wife Rachel Tergesen. He also has a son named Dallas (born August 30, 2001) with ex-girlfriend, actress Jennifer Thayer.

In 2007, Durst pled no-contest to seven misdemeanor charges, including battery, assault and reckless driving. According to court documents, Durst hit two Los Angeles residents with his car on October 25, 2006. He was given a 120-day suspended sentence, 20 hours community service and a $1,500 fine.

In 2009, Durst married Esther Nazarov and split after three months. Durst married his third wife, make-up artist Kseniya Beryazina, in 2012. They filed for divorce in September 2018 and finalized it in 2019. Durst married Arles Durst in 2022.

In 2015, Durst stated his interest in obtaining a Russian passport and spending half of the year in Crimea. He wrote a letter in which he stated that Vladimir Putin is "a great guy with clear moral principles and a nice person." Following that, Durst was banned by the Security Service of Ukraine from entering Ukraine for five years "in the interests of guaranteeing the security" of the country.

During the 2018 California wildfires, Durst's house burned down and he lost a majority of his possessions. His bandmate, Wes Borland, also lost several pieces of equipment in the fire. These were stored in Durst's house as they were scheduled to record the day after the fire.

Feuds

Slipknot 
Following Corey Taylor's public distaste for Korn drummer David Silveria's photo campaign for Calvin Klein, Taylor had taken copies of the magazine issues and burned them during multiple Slipknot live performances, culminating in Durst taking offense to the gestures. Durst would later make retaliatory comments towards Slipknot's fans in the spring of 1999, referring to them as "fat, ugly kids". Slipknot singer Corey Taylor responded during an appearance in Sydney by claiming that the fans of Slipknot "for the most part, enjoy all kinds of music, like Limp Bizkit… maybe." Taylor went on to claim that insulting fans of Slipknot could also be insulting fans of Limp Bizkit.

The two would find themselves on friendlier terms in 2010, while recording the album Gold Cobra; Durst included a line on the song 90.2.10 giving a shout out to Taylor. According to Taylor during a live interview in 2011; Durst’s children were allegedly fans of Slipknot.Limp Bizkit was later booked on the 2014 Japanese leg of Slipknot’s Knotfest tour along with Korn.

In 2021, after the death of ex-Slipknot drummer Joey Jordison, Limp Bizkit paid tribute to him at one of their shows.

Taproot & System of a Down 
Taproot had been an up-and-coming band from Ann Arbor, Michigan. In 1998 the band sent their demo to Durst who befriended them, often inviting them to various press releases in Los Angeles and occasionally bringing them to Limp Bizkit's concerts throughout the region. Durst was impressed with the band's material and had initially lined up Taproot to land a record contract through Interscope; however, executives from Interscope proved to be difficult to negotiate with as they wanted the rights to the 3 songs recorded by the band through their demo deal. The band eventually rejected the offer from Interscope and sought to sign with Atlantic Records through their new found friendship with System of a Down. Durst was enraged to eventually discover Taproot had defected to Atlantic, leading him to leave a threatening message on the answering machine of frontman Stephen Richards. Durst was later alleged to have personally removed System of a Down from the 1999 Family Values Tour as a retaliatory action.

Creed 
In June 2000, Limp Bizkit performed at the WXRK Dysfunctional Family Picnic, but showed up an hour late for their set. An Interscope spokesman stated that there was confusion over the band's set time. During the band's performance, Durst criticized Creed singer Scott Stapp, calling him "an egomaniac". Creed's representatives later presented Durst with an autographed anger management manual during an appearance on Total Request Live.

Placebo 
A feud between Limp Bizkit and Placebo began at a show Durst was hosting at Irving Plaza in December 1998. A side stage spat with Placebo singer Brian Molko led to Durst asking the crowd to chant "Placebo sucks!" prior to Placebo's performance. Molko later commented that nobody had told him that Durst would be hosting the show and that Placebo would have to follow opening act Kid Rock. Prior to introducing Staind as a part of K-Rock’s Dysfunctional Family Picnic in Holmdel, New Jersey in 1999, Durst once again encouraged the crowd to chant "Fuck Placebo". The feud was reignited during Big Day Out 2001, on which Placebo were billed below Limp Bizkit. By 2004, the feud had ended.

Eminem 
Durst fell out with rapper and former friend Eminem, regarding the latter's feud with Everlast. This resulted in Eminem creating a diss track against Limp Bizkit entitled "Girls", on his D12 group's 2001 album Devil's Night.  He would later reference Durst again in "Without Me", though the reference would be more neutral. Although Eminem directed insults at Durst, it was another member of Limp Bizkit, DJ Lethal, who caused the feud after claiming Everlast would handily beat Eminem in a fight.

In 2016, Fred Durst was caught by the paparazzi in the street and made him to talk about Eminem, Korn, Mark Wahlberg and his band’s touring. Fred says:
“Eminem used to be my hommie. I haven’t talked to him since he turned on me. I don’t know what happened but I still love him, I love this town, I like him as a person. I got mad love for him.”

In 2021, Fred Durst addresses hate hurled at Limp Bizkit and negative comparison to Eminem on a song called “Love The Hate” from the group’s new album “Still Sucks”.

Shaggy 2 Dope
On October 6, 2018, Shaggy 2 Dope from hip hop duo Insane Clown Posse attempted to dropkick Durst during a performance of the song "Faith". DJ Lethal from Limp Bizkit responded on Instagram Live, calling Shaggy a "clout chaser". According to 2 Dope, who is a pro wrestler with years of experience, he did not intend to cause Durst any harm and the motive for the kick stemmed from a dare he had with a security guard that let him on the stage after Durst announced "I need some people on stage."

In February 4, 2022, Shaggy 2 Dope apologized to Fred Durst on the Steve-O’s Wild Ride podcast for attacking him 4 years back. Fred Durst responded on social media with “No Hard Feelings at all”.

Trent Reznor & Marilyn Manson 
Trent Reznor, whose music project Nine Inch Nails was noted by Durst as an influence, repeatedly insulted him. In a profile for Kerrang!, Reznor mocked Durst saying "It's one thing if you know your place; like, 'Hey, I'm an idiot who plays shitty music but people buy it – fuck it, I'm having fun. But it's another thing when you think you're David Bowie after you've stayed up all night to write a song called 'Break Stuff'. I mean, Fred Durst probably spelt the word 'break' wrong the first couple of times. Fred Durst might be a cool guy; I don't know him. But his 'art' – in the word's loosest sense – sucks." Durst in turn made many references to Nine Inch Nails in the Limp Bizkit song "Hot Dog", leading to Reznor earning a co-writer credit. Reznor said there was no issue, jokingly stating that "When his record was going to print, [Durst] realised 'Fuck, I'd better ask permission first or I might get sued!' I let him do it – I wasn't gonna hold his record up.".

In 1999 Marilyn Manson insulted Limp Bizkit and their fans, calling them "illiterate apes that beat your ass in high school for being a 'fag' and now sell you tuneless testosterone anthems of misogyny and pretend to be outsiders...".

Fred Durst responded to Manson and Reznor's insults: "I understand that Marilyn Manson is very unhappy that his career has gone in a shambles and he's alienated his fans so if he has to say things like that because he's very mad at himself, I would forgive him. And Trent Reznor's in the fucking same boat. Trent Reznor is obviously unhappy with how he's alienated the world, how long he took to make a record, and how he thought he was immortal. We're just here doing what we do and we have nothing to say about anybody. I wish them both luck and I feel sorry that they're so jealous and mad at themselves that they have to talk shit."

Puddle of Mudd 
Due to the notoriety surrounding how Puddle of Mudd was signed with Durst, the band is often asked regarding their relationship with him. Wes Scantlin criticized Durst in an interview in 2004 with Canada's Chart magazine: "He doesn't write our songs, he doesn't produce our songs, he doesn't do anything for us. He doesn't do our videos anymore. He doesn't do anything for this band. I don't know what he's doing, I don't know what the guy's like. All I know is that he's like Mr Hollywood guy, Mr Celebrity. Like, 'I don't hang out with anybody except Hollywood celebrities'. Every single fucking interview I've ever fucking done, I get asked about that fucking guy... And for me to do interviews all the time and be asked about this certain individual... People think he writes music with me or something. He does not do that. I just don't get it. We have nothing in common. He doesn't even call us, he has his assistant call us to congratulate us on our record. Yeah, that's how pathetic he is."

On April 22, 2008, in an interview with Artisan News Service, Wes Scantlin took back his previous criticism of Fred Durst: "Fred got our foot in the door and helped us out tremendously. I think nowadays he's doing a lot of directing and we don't really speak to him too much but we appreciate everything he's ever done for our careers."

Discography

Limp Bizkit

 Three Dollar Bill, Y'all$ (1997)
 Significant Other (1999)
 Chocolate Starfish and the Hot Dog Flavored Water (2000)
 Results May Vary (2003)
 The Unquestionable Truth (Part 1) (2005)
 Gold Cobra (2011)
 Still Sucks (2021)

Singles

Filmography

Awards and nominations

References

External links

 
 Limp Bizkit website
 
 

1970 births
American heavy metal singers
American male rappers
American male singer-songwriters
American music video directors
American rock songwriters
American tattoo artists
Limp Bizkit members
Living people
Musicians from Jacksonville, Florida
Nu metal singers
People from Gastonia, North Carolina
Rap metal musicians
Rappers from Florida
Rappers from North Carolina
Film directors from North Carolina
Singer-songwriters from Florida
20th-century American singers
21st-century American singers
Singer-songwriters from North Carolina
Film directors from Florida
21st-century American rappers